Mahabubnagar Lok Sabha constituency is one of the 17 Lok Sabha (Lower House of the Parliament) constituencies in Telangana state in southern India.

Manne Srinivas Reddy of the TRS was elected MP in the 2019 election

Overview
Since its inception in 1957 Mahabubnagar seat is a Congress stronghold, various political outfits like the Telangana Praja Samithi, Bharatiya Janata Party and the Janata Party have won it during different general elections.

During the final stages of Telangana Agitation it was represented by Kalvakuntla Chandrashekar Rao, the founder of Telangana Rashtra Samithi.

Assembly segments
Mahbubnagar Lok Sabha constituency comprises the following Legislative Assembly segments:

Members of Parliament

Election results

General Election, 2019

General Election, 2014

General Election, 2009

General Election, 2004

Trivia
J. Rameshwar Rao, member of Wanaparthy Samsthanam represented the constituency in 2nd,4th,5th and 6th Lok Sabha respectively.
Jaipal Reddy, former Union Minister represented the constituency in 8th Lok Sabha and 12th Lok Sabha respectively.
K. Chandrasekhar Rao, current Chief Minister of Telangana represented the constituency in 15th Lok Sabha.

See also
 Mahbubnagar district
 List of Constituencies of the Lok Sabha

References

External links
 Mahbubnagar lok sabha  constituency election 2019 date and schedule

Lok Sabha constituencies in Telangana
Mahbubnagar district